Thomas Leroy Hankins (born September 9, 1933, in Lawrence, Kansas) is an American historian of science.

Education and career
Hankins studied physics at Yale University with a bachelor's degree in 1956 and at Harvard University with an M.A.T. (Master of Arts in Teaching) in 1958. From 1958 to 1962 he taught high school physics and worked at Woods Hole Oceanographic Institute during the summers. In 1962 he matriculated in the history department of Cornell University, where he graduated with a Ph.D. in 1964. In the history department of the University of Washington (UW), he was an assistant professor from 1964 to 1969, an associate professor from 1969 to 1975, and a full professor from 1975 to 2000, when he retired as professor emeritus. In retirement he continued to teach part-time at UW until 2005. In his early years at UW, he was the  only historian of science in the department and taught widely in the history of science. In later years his teaching focused on early modern science, the Age of Enlightenment and the history of the atomic bomb.

Hankins's work in the 1970s and 1980s particularly concerned with theoretical physics in the 18th and 19th centuries. He wrote biographies of William Rowan Hamilton and Jean-Baptiste le Rond d'Alembert, and the relationship between science and the Age of Enlightenment. His 1979 paper In Defence of Biography: The Use of Biography in the History of Science is noteworthy (with over 150 citations). In 1987 his book Science and the Enlightenment (1985, Cambridge University Press) won the Watson Davis and Helen Miles Davis Prize. In the 1990s he worked on the history of scientific instruments.

From 1982 to 1985 he chaired the U. S. National Committee on the History and Philosophy of Science at the National Academy of Sciences. He has served on the editorial boards of Isis, Eighteenth-Century Studies, Osiris, Perspectives on Science, and Historical Studies in the Natural Sciences.

For the academic year 1982–1983, Hankins was a Guggenheim Fellow. From the History of Science Society, he received in 1980 the Zeitlin-Ver Brugge Prize, in 1998 the George Sarton Medal, and in 2007 the Price/Webster Prize.

Selected publications

Articles

Books

References

External links
 

1933 births
Living people
20th-century American historians
21st-century American historians
American historians of science
American male non-fiction writers
Yale University alumni
Harvard University alumni
Cornell University alumni
University of Washington faculty